Tatiana Jaseková (born 27 March 1988) is a Slovak racing cyclist. She rode in the women's time trial event at the 2018 UCI Road World Championships.

References

External links

1988 births
Living people
Slovak female cyclists
Place of birth missing (living people)